"Wild West Show" is  a debut song co-written and recorded by American country music duo Big & Rich.  It was released in December 2003 as the first single from their debut album Horse of a Different Color.  It reached No. 21 on the U.S. Billboard Hot Country Singles & Tracks (now Hot Country Songs) charts.  The song was written by Big Kenny, John Rich and Blair Daly.

Content
The song uses 19th-century Western imagery to describe an argument between a man and a woman ("It was a big showdown / Oh yeah, we stood our ground / Shot out the lights, it got a little crazy"). The song also talks about forgiveness and a relationship.

Critical reception
Chuck Eddy of The Village Voice wrote that the song "mixes a placid keyboard intro, spacious spaghetti-western guitars, and Andes flute solos into a tepee-and-peace-pipe lyric that repeatedly chants 'hey yaaaa!'" Deborah Evans Price of Billboard magazine also gave it a positive review, saying that it has a "very distinct vibe", also calling it "hauntingly beautiful" and saying that it had "quirky Western imagery".

Personnel
From Horse of a Different Color liner notes.
 Big Kenny - vocals
 Dennis Burnside - keyboards
 Mike Johnson - steel guitar
 Wayne Killius - drums, shaker, peanut can
 Duncan Mullins - bass guitar
 John Rich - acoustic guitar, vocals
 Adam Shoenfeld - electric guitar
 Nicole Summers - flute

Chart positions

References

2003 debut singles
2003 songs
Big & Rich songs
Songs written by Blair Daly
Songs written by Big Kenny
Songs written by John Rich
Song recordings produced by Paul Worley
Song recordings produced by John Rich
Warner Records singles